The 2022 Arab Club Basketball Championship was the 34th season of the Arab Club Basketball Championship. The tournament is held from 5 October to 15 October 2022 in Kuwait. Al Ahly was the defending champion. All games are played in the Al-Ittihad Hall in Kuwait City.

Kuwait SC won its first Arab championship after defeating Al Ahly Cairo in the final, which was a re-match of the previous year.

Teams 
Contrary to other seasons, no teams from Tunisia, Saudi Arabia and the United Arab Emirates participated. The following teams qualified for the season:

Regular season
The draw for the groups was held 18 August 2022.

Group A

Goup B

Group C

Goup D

Knock-out stage

Round of 16

Quarterfinals

Semifinals

Third place game

Final

Statistical leaders

References 

2022 in basketball
International basketball competitions hosted by Kuwait
Sport in the Arab world
Sport in Kuwait